The men's singles luge competition at the 1968 Winter Olympics in Grenoble was held from 11 to 13 February, at Villard-de-Lans. Originally, four runs were scheduled, but poor weather meant that the competition was delayed, and the fourth run was eventually cancelled.

Results

References

Luge at the 1968 Winter Olympics
Luge